Alpena High School is a public high school in Alpena, Michigan, United States. It serves students in grades 9-12 for the Alpena Public Schools.

Academics
Alpena ranked 204th in Michigan and 5,937th nationally in the 2020 U.S. News & World Report annual survey of US public schools.

Demographics
The demographic breakdown of the 1,147 students enrolled in 2020-21 was:
Male - 50.3%
Female - 49.7%
Native American/Alaskan - 0.2%
Asian - 0.4%
Black - 0.5%
Hispanic - 0.9%
White - 94.3%
Multiracial - 4%
In addition, 51.2% of the students were eligible for free or reduced-cost lunch.

Athletics 
Alpena's Wildcats compete in the Big North Athletic Conference. School colors are green and white. Alpena offers the following Michigan High School Athletic Association (MHSAA) sanctioned sports:

Baseball (boys) 
Basketball (girls and boys) 
Competitive cheerleading (girls) 
Cross country (girls and boys) 
Football (boys) 
Golf (girls and boys) 
Ice hockey (boys)
State champion - 1981, 1987, 1993
Soccer (girls and boys) 
Softball (girls)
Tennis (girls and boys) 
Track and field (girls and boys) 
Volleyball (girls) 
Wrestling (boys)

Notable alumni
Lisa Dietlin, philanthropic consultant 
Jim Dutcher, former head basketball coach for the University of Minnesota
Butch Feher, National Basketball Association (NBA) shooting guard
Fred Grambau, Canadian Football League (CFL) defensive tackle
Kenneth Joseph Povish, Roman Catholic bishop
Paul Fitzpatrick Russell, auxiliary bishop of the Archdiocese of Detroit

References

External links
 

Public high schools in Michigan
Schools in Alpena County, Michigan
1967 establishments in Michigan
School buildings completed in 1967